Gamma Andromedae, Latinized from γ Andromedae, is the third-brightest point of light in the northern constellation of Andromeda. It is a multiple star system approximately 350 light-years from Earth. The system is drifting closer to the Sun with a radial velocity in the range of −12 to −14 km/s.

Observation 

In 1778, German physicist Johann Tobias Mayer discovered that γ Andromedae is a double star. When examined in a small telescope, it appears to be a bright, golden-yellow star next to a dimmer, indigo-blue star, separated by approximately 10 arcseconds. The pair is often considered by stargazers to be a beautiful double star with a striking contrast of color.

The brighter member, γ1 Andromedae, is the primary of the system, and is thus designated component γ Andromedae A. It has the official proper name Almach , which was used as the traditional name of the naked eye star, and thus the system as a whole. The fainter secondary is γ2 Andromedae or γ Andromedae B. It was later discovered that γ2 Andromedae is itself a triple star system. What appears as a single star to the naked eye is thus a quadruple star system.

Nomenclature 

γ Andromedae (Latinised to Gamma Andromedae) is the system's Bayer designation; γ1 and γ2 Andromedae those of its two constituents. The designations of those constituents as Gamma Andromedae A and B derive from the convention used by the Washington Multiplicity Catalog (WMC) for multiple star systems, and adopted by the International Astronomical Union (IAU). In 2016, the IAU organized a Working Group on Star Names (WGSN) to catalog and standardize proper names for stars. The WGSN approved the name Almach for the component Gamma Andromedae A on 20 July 2016 and it is now so included in the List of IAU-approved Star Names.

Almach was the traditional name (also spelt as Almaach, Almaack, Almak, Almaak, or Alamak), derived from the Arabic العناق (al-‘anāq), "the caracal" (desert lynx). Another term for this star used by medieval astronomers writing in Arabic was رجل المسلسلة (Rijl al Musalsalah), "Foot of The [Chained] Woman". In the catalogue of stars in the Calendarium of Al Achsasi al Mouakket, this star was designated الخامس النعامة (Al Khamis al Na'amah), which was translated into Latin as Quinta Struthionum, meaning the fifth ostrich.

In the Babylonian star catalogues, γ Andromedae, together with Triangulum, formed the constellation known as MULAPIN "The Plough". Astrologically, this star was considered "honourable and eminent".

Stellar properties

γ1 Andromedae (A component) is a massive bright giant star with a spectral classification of K2+IIb, and is presently at an evolutionary stage following the asymptotic giant branch. It does not display a chemical enhancement of s-process elements. The star has an apparent visual magnitude of approximately 2.26. It has an estimated 24 times the mass of the Sun with an age of 6.5 million years.

γ2 Andromedae (BC component), with an overall apparent visual magnitude of 4.84, is 9.6 arcseconds away from γ1 Andromedae at a position angle of 63 degrees.

γ1 and γ2 have an orbital period of approximately 5,000 years.

In October 1842, Wilhelm Struve found that γ2 Andromedae was itself a double star whose components were separated by less than an arcsecond. The components are an object of apparent visual magnitude 5.5, γ Andromedae B, and an A-type main-sequence star with apparent visual magnitude 6.3, γ Andromedae C. They have an orbital period of about 64 years and a high eccentricity (ovalness) of 0.927. Spectrograms taken from 1957 to 1959 revealed that γ Andromedae B was itself a spectroscopic binary, composed of two B-type main-sequence stars orbiting each other with a period of 2.67 days. The two orbits may be coplanar. At present the angular distance between both stars is 0.16 arcsecond .

Almach as a name
 was the name of United States navy ship.

See also
 NGC 752

References

External links
 Almaak (Gamma Andromedae) at The Internet Encyclopedia of Science
 Image ALMACH
 Almaak on AstroDwarf
 

4
5 
Spectroscopic binaries
K-type bright giants
B-type main-sequence stars
A-type main-sequence stars

Andromeda (constellation)
Andromedae, Gamma
BD+41 0395
Andromedae, 57
012533 4
0603
009640
Almach